The 1986 Asian Games, officially known as the 10th Asian Games and the X Asiad and commonly known as Seoul 1986 were held from 20 September to 5 October 1986, in Seoul, South Korea. The venues and facilities of the 10th Asiad were the same venues and facilities that would be used in the 1988 Summer Olympics, as it was considered a test event.

Seoul had previously been scheduled to host the 1970 games, but it received security threats from neighbouring North Korea, forcing it to give up hosting the games to previous 1966 host Bangkok, Thailand.

Host city selection
Baghdad, Iraq, Pyongyang, North Korea and Seoul, South Korea were the bidding cities for the Games, but during the process Baghdad and Pyongyang withdrew, leaving Seoul as only bidding city.

Boycotting countries

Communist states North Korea, Mongolia, Vietnam, Laos, Cambodia, Afghanistan, and South Yemen, as well as Burma, Syria, and Brunei all boycotted the Games for political reasons and conditions. However, the People's Republic of China, which was set to host the next games in Beijing, competed, and ultimately finished at the top of the medal table. Two years later, all except North Korea participated at the 1988 Summer Olympics, although Brunei sent only one official and no athletes.

Terrorist attack
A North Korean spy detonated a bomb behind a vending machine in Gimpo International Airport and killed five people, including a technician, just a few days before the Games started.

Participating nations
The following 27 nations participated.

Mascot

The official mascot for the 1986 Asian Games was Hodori the tiger, which was also the mascot of the 1988 Summer Olympics.

Sports

Calendar

Venues
The following venues were used during the Games.

Medal table

The top ten ranked NOCs at these Games are listed below. The host nation, South Korea, is highlighted.

See also
 1986 Asian Winter Games
 1988 Summer Olympics
 2002 Asian Games
 2014 Asian Games

References

External links
Ocasia

 
Asian Games
Asian Games
Asian Games
Multi-sport events in South Korea
Sports competitions in Seoul
Asian Games by year
Asian Games
Asian Games, 1986
International sports boycotts
Asian Games
Asian Games